Ouanoukrim (also Ouenkrim) is a mountain in Morocco located south of Marrakesh. It has two summits, Timzguida and Ras Ouanoukrim, which are the second and third highest peaks of the Atlas range.

References

Mountains of Morocco
Atlas Mountains
Geography of Marrakesh-Safi
Four-thousanders of Africa